The 6th constituency of the Bas-Rhin is a French legislative constituency in the Bas-Rhin département.

Description

The 6th Constituency of Bas-Rhin covers the mid Western portion of the Département including the entire Arrondissement of Molsheim but also Obernai from the Arrondissement of Sélestat-Erstein.

The constituency includes the small towns of Molsheim and Wasselonne as well as a portion of the eastern fringes of the Vosges Mountains.

The constituency had been held by parties of the right and centre right for its entire existence during the 5th Republic until 2022, when it was gained by the centrist MoDem party.

Historic representation

Election results

2022

 
 
|-
| colspan="8" bgcolor="#E9E9E9"|
|-

2017

|- style="background-color:#E9E9E9;text-align:center;"
! colspan="2" rowspan="2" style="text-align:left;" | Candidate
! rowspan="2" colspan="2" style="text-align:left;" | Party
! colspan="2" | 1st round
! colspan="2" | 2nd round
|- style="background-color:#E9E9E9;text-align:center;"
! width="75" | Votes
! width="30" | %
! width="75" | Votes
! width="30" | %
|-
| style="background-color:" |
| style="text-align:left;" | Laurent Furst
| style="text-align:left;" | The Republicans
| LR
| 
| 36.21
| 
| 62.60
|-
| style="background-color:" |
| style="text-align:left;" | Guy Salomon
| style="text-align:left;" | Democratic Movement
| MoDem
| 
| 29.48
| 
| 37.40
|-
| style="background-color:" |
| style="text-align:left;" | Hombeline Du Parc
| style="text-align:left;" | National Front
| FN
| 
| 13.80
| colspan="2" style="text-align:left;" |
|-
| style="background-color:" |
| style="text-align:left;" | Denis Gadot
| style="text-align:left;" | La France Insoumise
| FI
| 
| 5.74
| colspan="2" style="text-align:left;" |
|-
| style="background-color:" |
| style="text-align:left;" | Jeanine Plaisant-Hermanns
| style="text-align:left;" | Regionalist
| REG
| 
| 5.16
| colspan="2" style="text-align:left;" |
|-
| style="background-color:" |
| style="text-align:left;" | Alexandre Gonçalves
| style="text-align:left;" | Ecologist
| ECO
| 
| 4.00
| colspan="2" style="text-align:left;" |
|-
| style="background-color:" |
| style="text-align:left;" | Martin Effenberger
| style="text-align:left;" | Socialist Party
| PS
| 
| 1.39
| colspan="2" style="text-align:left;" |
|-
| style="background-color:" |
| style="text-align:left;" | Sara Chabaane
| style="text-align:left;" | Debout la France
| DLF
| 
| 1.21
| colspan="2" style="text-align:left;" |
|-
| style="background-color:" |
| style="text-align:left;" | Régis Meyer
| style="text-align:left;" | Independent
| DIV
| 
| 0.88
| colspan="2" style="text-align:left;" |
|-
| style="background-color:" |
| style="text-align:left;" | Gilles Pfaffenhof
| style="text-align:left;" | Independent
| DIV
| 
| 0.60
| colspan="2" style="text-align:left;" |
|-
| style="background-color:" |
| style="text-align:left;" | Evelyne Monteleone
| style="text-align:left;" | Independent
| DIV
| 
| 0.50
| colspan="2" style="text-align:left;" |
|-
| style="background-color:" |
| style="text-align:left;" | Roxane Ferrez
| style="text-align:left;" | Far Left
| EXG
| 
| 0.43
| colspan="2" style="text-align:left;" |
|-
| style="background-color:" |
| style="text-align:left;" | Odile Agrafeil
| style="text-align:left;" | Communist Party
| PCF
| 
| 0.36
| colspan="2" style="text-align:left;" |
|-
| style="background-color:" |
| style="text-align:left;" | Olivier Laustriat
| style="text-align:left;" | Independent
| DIV
| 
| 0.25
| colspan="2" style="text-align:left;" |
|-
| colspan="8" style="background-color:#E9E9E9;"|
|- style="font-weight:bold"
| colspan="4" style="text-align:left;" | Total
| 
| 100%
| 
| 100%
|-
| colspan="8" style="background-color:#E9E9E9;"|
|-
| colspan="4" style="text-align:left;" | Registered voters
| 
| style="background-color:#E9E9E9;"|
| 
| style="background-color:#E9E9E9;"|
|-
| colspan="4" style="text-align:left;" | Blank/Void ballots
| 
| 1.40%
| 
| 5.25%
|-
| colspan="4" style="text-align:left;" | Turnout
| 
| 49.06%
| 
| 43.62%
|-
| colspan="4" style="text-align:left;" | Abstentions
| 
| 50.94%
| 
| 56.38%
|-
| colspan="8" style="background-color:#E9E9E9;"|
|- style="font-weight:bold"
| colspan="6" style="text-align:left;" | Result
| colspan="2" style="background-color:" | LR GAIN FROM UMP
|}

2012
Laurent Furst was elected with more than 50% of the vote in the first round of voting, and therefore no second round took place.

|- style="background-color:#E9E9E9;text-align:center;"
! colspan="2" rowspan="2" style="text-align:left;" | Candidate
! rowspan="2" colspan="2" style="text-align:left;" | Party
! colspan="2" | 1st round
|- style="background-color:#E9E9E9;text-align:center;"
! width="75" | Votes
! width="30" | %
|-
| style="background-color:" |
| style="text-align:left;" | Laurent Furst
| style="text-align:left;" | Union for a Popular Movement
| UMP
| 
| 51.68
|-
| style="background-color:" |
| style="text-align:left;" | Brigitte Tinot
| style="text-align:left;" | National Front
| FN
| 
| 17.82
|-
| style="background-color:" |
| style="text-align:left;" | Astrid Scharly
| style="text-align:left;" | Socialist Party
| PS
| 
| 16.01
|-
| style="background-color:" |
| style="text-align:left;" | Jean Vogel
| style="text-align:left;" | Europe Ecology - The Greens
| EELV
| 
| 9.39
|-
| style="background-color:" |
| style="text-align:left;" | Dorothée Unterberger
| style="text-align:left;" | Left Front
| FG
| 
| 1.93
|-
| style="background-color:" |
| style="text-align:left;" | Anne-Sophie Freliger
| style="text-align:left;" | The Centre for France
| CEN
| 
| 1.88
|-
| style="background-color:" |
| style="text-align:left;" | Rémy Wendling
| style="text-align:left;" | Other
| AUT
| 
| 0.83
|-
| style="background-color:" |
| style="text-align:left;" | Jeanne-Françoise Langlade
| style="text-align:left;" | Far Left
| EXG
| 
| 0.46
|-
| colspan="6" style="background-color:#E9E9E9;"|
|- style="font-weight:bold"
| colspan="4" style="text-align:left;" | Total
| 
| 100%
|-
| colspan="6" style="background-color:#E9E9E9;"|
|-
| colspan="4" style="text-align:left;" | Registered voters
| 
| style="background-color:#E9E9E9;"|
|-
| colspan="4" style="text-align:left;" | Blank/Void ballots
| 
| 1.39%
|-
| colspan="4" style="text-align:left;" | Turnout
| 
| 55.87%
|-
| colspan="4" style="text-align:left;" | Abstentions
| 
| 44.13%
|-
| colspan="6" style="background-color:#E9E9E9;"|
|- style="font-weight:bold"
| colspan="4" style="text-align:left;" | Result
| colspan="2" style="background-color:" | UMP HOLD
|}

2007
Alain Ferry was elected with more than 50% of the vote in the first round of voting, and therefore no second round took place.

|- style="background-color:#E9E9E9;text-align:center;"
! colspan="2" rowspan="2" style="text-align:left;" | Candidate
! rowspan="2" colspan="2" style="text-align:left;" | Party
! colspan="2" | 1st round
|- style="background-color:#E9E9E9;text-align:center;"
! width="75" | Votes
! width="30" | %
|-
| style="background-color:" |
| style="text-align:left;" | Alain Ferry
| style="text-align:left;" | Union for a Popular Movement
| UMP
| 
| 67.38
|-
| style="background-color:" |
| style="text-align:left;" | Cédric Baillet
| style="text-align:left;" | UDF-Democratic Movement
| UDF-MoDem
| 
| 9.30
|-
| style="background-color:" |
| style="text-align:left;" | Marie-Madeleine Iantzen
| style="text-align:left;" | Socialist Party
| PS
| 
| 8.41
|-
| style="background-color:" |
| style="text-align:left;" | Nathalie Tomasi
| style="text-align:left;" | National Front
| FN
| 
| 5.30
|-
| style="background-color:" |
| style="text-align:left;" | Mireille Metz
| style="text-align:left;" | The Greens
| LV
| 
| 3.70
|-
| style="background-color:" |
| style="text-align:left;" | Valérie Acker
| style="text-align:left;" | Far Left
| EXG
| 
| 1.55
|-
| style="background-color:" |
| style="text-align:left;" | Marie-Noëlle Eastes
| style="text-align:left;" | Ecologist
| ECO
| 
| 1.06
|-
| style="background-color:" |
| style="text-align:left;" | Joël Allain
| style="text-align:left;" | Communist Party
| PCF
| 
| 0.89
|-
| style="background-color:" |
| style="text-align:left;" | Bernadette Lutz
| style="text-align:left;" | Independent
| DIV
| 
| 0.88
|-
| style="background-color:" |
| style="text-align:left;" | Jean Meyer
| style="text-align:left;" | Far Left
| EXG
| 
| 0.84
|-
| style="background-color:" |
| style="text-align:left;" | Marie Jeanne Mailley
| style="text-align:left;" | Far Right
| EXD
| 
| 0.69
|-
| colspan="6" style="background-color:#E9E9E9;"|
|- style="font-weight:bold"
| colspan="4" style="text-align:left;" | Total
| 
| 100%
|-
| colspan="6" style="background-color:#E9E9E9;"|
|-
| colspan="4" style="text-align:left;" | Registered voters
| 
| style="background-color:#E9E9E9;"|
|-
| colspan="4" style="text-align:left;" | Blank/Void ballots
| 
| 1.65%
|-
| colspan="4" style="text-align:left;" | Turnout
| 
| 58.07%
|-
| colspan="4" style="text-align:left;" | Abstentions
| 
| 41.93%
|-
| colspan="6" style="background-color:#E9E9E9;"|
|- style="font-weight:bold"
| colspan="4" style="text-align:left;" | Result
| colspan="2" style="background-color:" | UMP HOLD
|}

2002
Alain Ferry was elected under the Union for a Presidential Majority candidate but was a member of the Radical Party. Furthermore, he was elected with more than 50% of the vote in the first round of voting, and therefore no second round took place.

|- style="background-color:#E9E9E9;text-align:center;"
! colspan="2" rowspan="2" style="text-align:left;" | Candidate
! rowspan="2" colspan="2" style="text-align:left;" | Party
! colspan="2" | 1st round
|- style="background-color:#E9E9E9;text-align:center;"
! width="75" | Votes
! width="30" | %
|-
| style="background-color:" |
| style="text-align:left;" | Alain Ferry
| style="text-align:left;" | Union for a Presidential Majority
| UMP
| 
| 60.63
|-
| style="background-color:" |
| style="text-align:left;" | Nathalie Tomasi
| style="text-align:left;" | National Front
| FN
| 
| 14.52
|-
| style="background-color:" |
| style="text-align:left;" | Michele Zumstein
| style="text-align:left;" | Socialist Party
| PS
| 
| 12.95
|-
| style="background-color:" |
| style="text-align:left;" | Mireille Metz
| style="text-align:left;" | The Greens
| LV
| 
| 3.45
|-
| style="background-color:" |
| style="text-align:left;" | Daniel Schilling
| style="text-align:left;" | National Republican Movement
| MNR
| 
| 2.71
|-
| style="background-color:" |
| style="text-align:left;" | Bernard Goepfert
| style="text-align:left;" | Ecologist
| ECO
| 
| 1.54
|-
| style="background-color:" |
| style="text-align:left;" | Jean Meyer
| style="text-align:left;" | Workers’ Struggle
| LO
| 
| 1.14
|-
| style="background-color:" |
| style="text-align:left;" | J. Paul Fabacher
| style="text-align:left;" | Communist Party
| PCF
| 
| 1.01
|-
| style="background-color:" |
| style="text-align:left;" | Gilles Dimnet
| style="text-align:left;" | Revolutionary Communist League
| LCR
| 
| 0.85
|-
| style="background-color:" |
| style="text-align:left;" | Irene Eckmann
| style="text-align:left;" | Republican Pole
| PR
| 
| 0.78
|-
| style="background-color:" |
| style="text-align:left;" | Pascale Petermann
| style="text-align:left;" | Independent
| DIV
| 
| 0.42
|-
| colspan="6" style="background-color:#E9E9E9;"|
|- style="font-weight:bold"
| colspan="4" style="text-align:left;" | Total
| 
| 100%
|-
| colspan="6" style="background-color:#E9E9E9;"|
|-
| colspan="4" style="text-align:left;" | Registered voters
| 
| style="background-color:#E9E9E9;"|
|-
| colspan="4" style="text-align:left;" | Blank/Void ballots
| 
| 2.42%
|-
| colspan="4" style="text-align:left;" | Turnout
| 
| 61.25%
|-
| colspan="4" style="text-align:left;" | Abstentions
| 
| 38.75%
|-
| colspan="6" style="background-color:#E9E9E9;"|
|- style="font-weight:bold"
| colspan="4" style="text-align:left;" | Result
| colspan="2" style="background-color:" | PR HOLD
|}

Sources

6